Football Club Martigny-Sports, is a football club from Martigny, Kanton Wallis, in Switzerland.

The club was founded in 1917, is currently playing in the Swiss 1. Liga.

External links 
 Official site

Football clubs in Switzerland
Association football clubs established in 1917
1917 establishments in Switzerland